47 Meters Down is a 2017 survival horror film directed by Johannes Roberts, written by Roberts and Ernest Riera, and starring Claire Holt and Mandy Moore. The plot follows sisters who are invited to cage dive while on holiday in Mexico. When the winch system holding the cage breaks and the cage plummets to the ocean floor with the two girls trapped inside, they must find a way to escape, with their air supplies running low and great white sharks stalking nearby.

The film was released in the United States on 16 June 2017, and in the United Kingdom on 26 July 2017. It grossed $62 million worldwide against a budget of about $5 million.

A sequel, titled 47 Meters Down: Uncaged, was released on August 16, 2019. The two films have grossed over $100 million worldwide.

Plot
Sisters Lisa (Mandy Moore) and Kate (Claire Holt) are on vacation in Mexico after Lisa's boyfriend recently broke up with her. They decide to go watch sharks from a diving cage with two local men. At the docks, Lisa is wary of the boat and its owner, Captain Taylor (Matthew Modine). Kate has had one lesson in diving, but Lisa has never dived. They lie to Taylor and tell him that they are both experienced divers. Unbeknownst to everyone, the winch supporting the cage is unsecured.

Taylor sends Lisa and Kate down, with masks that allow them to talk to him on the surface and to each other. They are soon surrounded by great white sharks, but the winch boom breaks free and the cage sinks to the ocean floor 47 metres down and out of communication range with the boat. Kate swims up seven meters to resume communication with Taylor, who tells her that Javier (Chris J. Johnson) will be coming down with a spare winch cable to attach to the cage. He advises them to stay in the cage because the sharks are close by. Both women are running out of air but soon see a flashlight in the distance. With Kate low on air from the previous swim, Lisa swims out to get Javier's attention. A shark tries to attack her but she avoids it.

Lisa becomes disoriented about her position. Javier attempts to usher her back towards safety but he is killed by a great white shark. Lisa takes his spear gun and the winch cable and swims back to the cage. The spare cable is attached but it snaps and the cage sinks back down, landing on Lisa's leg and pinning her. Kate tells Taylor they are low on air and Lisa is trapped. He sends air tanks down and tells them the coast guard is an hour out. He also warns that the second tank may cause nitrogen narcosis, which can lead to hallucinations. Kate finds three flares to signal the coast guard. As she returns to the cage, she is attacked and (presumably) devoured by a great white shark. Lisa uses the spear from the spear gun to pull a tank toward her and dons it, getting more air.

Kate is injured and her blood is attracting more sharks. Lisa uses her BCD to lift up the cage, freeing her leg, and she swims to Kate. Due to the nature of Kate's wounds, the sisters decide to swim to the surface, using one of the flares to scare off the sharks. At the 20-meter mark, Taylor reminds them they must wait five minutes to decompress and avoid the bends. Kate accidentally drops the second flare and lights the third, discovering that they are surrounded by sharks.

As the third flare goes out, Taylor yells for them to drop their gear and make a break for the surface, and they swim as fast as they can. One of the sharks bites Lisa's leg but she escapes. Both women make it to the boat but Lisa is attacked again. She sticks her fingers in the shark's eye and it releases her. The men pull the sisters onto the boat, saving them, and start patching up their wounds when they see that the shark has bitten off half of Lisa's leg.

It is revealed that Lisa has been hallucinating all this time due to nitrogen narcosis and that she is still at the bottom of the ocean with her leg pinned under the cage, with Kate gone. As Coast Guard divers arrive to rescue her and carry her to the surface, Lisa begins coming out of her hallucination, calling out to Kate. When Lisa looks around for Kate, she realizes that her sister is not present and begins crying, remembering that Kate was killed by the great white shark.

Cast

 Mandy Moore as Lisa
 Claire Holt as Kate
 Matthew Modine as Captain Taylor
 Chris Johnson as Javier
 Yani Gellman as Louis
 Santiago Segura as Benjamin

Production
Principal photography took place in the Dominican Republic, and Pinewood Indomina Studios, Dominican Republic in July 2015, and concluded the following month. Additional photography took place in January 2016.

Release
Original distributor Dimension Films had initially set a North American DVD and VOD release date for 2 August 2016. However, on 25 July 2016, Variety reported that Dimension had sold the rights to Entertainment Studios. Entertainment Studios cancelled the 2 August home release and instead committed to a theatrical release in the United States in summer 2017. The working title for the film was 47 Meters Down, which Dimension had changed to In the Deep for their home release, but upon acquiring the film Entertainment Studios reverted to the original title. Dimension had already sent out screeners and shipped DVDs to retailers before the deal took place. The DVDs, under the title In the Deep, were recalled. However, several retailers broke the street date, and a handful of physical copies were sold and have since turned up on eBay as collectors' items.

The film was released theatrically in the United Kingdom on 26 July 2017 & United States on 16 June 2017, and spent about $30 million on prints and advertising.

Reception

Box office
47 Meters Down grossed $44.3 million in the United States and Canada and $17.4 million in other territories for a worldwide total of $61.7 million, against a production budget of $5.5 million.

In North America, 47 Meters Down was released alongside All Eyez on Me, Rough Night and Cars 3, and was initially projected to gross around $5 million from 2,300 theatres in its opening weekend. It made $4.5 million on its first day (including $735,000 from Thursday night previews), increasing weekend estimates to $11 million. It went on to debut to $11.5 million, finishing 5th at the box office. In its second weekend, the film dropped 34%, grossing $7.4 million and finishing 4th at the box office. It was the second highest-grossing indie film of 2017.

Critical response
The website's critical consensus reads, "47 Meters Down doesn't take its terrifying premise quite as far as it should, but its toothy antagonists still offer a few thrills for less demanding genre enthusiasts." On Metacritic the film has a weighed average score of 52 out of 100, based on 24 critics, indicating "mixed or average reviews". Audiences polled by CinemaScore gave the film an average grade of "C" on an A+ to F scale, while PostTrak reported filmgoers gave it a 55% overall positive score.

Joe Leydon of Variety wrote: "Director Johannes Roberts' mostly underwater thriller is a compact and sturdily crafted B-movie that generates enough scares and suspense to qualify as — well, maybe not a pleasant surprise, but a reasonably entertaining one."

Accolades

47 Meters Down was nominated for the 44th Saturn Awards as Best Horror Film in 2018, but lost to Get Out.

Sequel

On 8 September 2017, it was announced that production studio, The Fyzz Facility, is working on a sequel titled 48 Meters Down, in which Roberts, Riera, and Harris & Lane will return as director/writer, co-writer, and producers, respectively. The sequel is set in Mexico and centers around a group of young women who decide to explore some hidden underwater ruins located off-the-beaten trail. None of the cast from the previous film returns in the sequel. The new cast members are John Corbett, Nia Long, Sophie Nelisse, Corinne Foxx, Sistine Stallone, Brianne Tju, Davi Santos, Khylin Rhambo and Brec Bassinger. 47 Meters Down: Uncaged was released August 16, 2019.

See also
 
 Open Water (film)
 The Reef (2010 film)
 The Shallows (film)

References

External links

 
 

2017 films
Films about survivors of seafaring accidents or incidents
British survival films
Films about sharks
Films set on beaches
Films set on islands
Films set in Mexico
Films shot in the Dominican Republic
Films set in 2016
Films about shark attacks
Films scored by Tomandandy
Seafaring films
British adventure films
British thriller drama films
British horror thriller films
British horror drama films
British natural horror films
2010s adventure films
2017 thriller drama films
2017 horror films
47 Meters Down films
2017 horror thriller films
American natural horror films
American horror drama films
Adventure horror films
Sea adventure films
Films featuring underwater diving
Films directed by Johannes Roberts
Films with screenplays by Johannes Roberts
American survival films
Entertainment Studios films
2017 drama films
2010s English-language films
2010s American films
2010s British films